Poum Lake is a lake on Vancouver Island east of south west end of Comox Lake.

See also
List of lakes of British Columbia

References

Alberni Valley
Lakes of Vancouver Island
Nelson Land District